Coleophora niveicostella is a moth of the family Coleophoridae and was first described by Philipp Christoph Zeller in 1839. It is found from Sweden and Latvia to Spain, Italy and Greece and from Great Britain to Romania.

Description
Adults are on wing in July.

The larvae feed on Thymus praecox, Thymus pulegioides and Thymus serpyllum. The oral half is tubular, while the rear part strongly laterally compressed. The mouth angle is about 30°. The case looks like a sheath case, but is in fact a composite leaf case. The larva cuts off mined leaves, after having removed the complete leaf margin: what is left is an upper and a lower epidermis, connected by the stub of the petiole. Leaves treated in this way are placed in front of the old case. Full-grown larvae can be found in mid June.

References

External links
 Lepiforum.de

niveicostella
Moths described in 1839
Moths of Europe
Taxa named by Philipp Christoph Zeller